Sheldon is an English masculine given name as well as a surname combining the Old English scelf (rock ledge shelf) and the place name haddon, which in turn comes from the words hǣth (heath) and dūn (hill; but also, valley). Notable people with the name include:

Given name
Sheldon Adelson (1933–2021), American billionaire businessman
Sheldon Bach (1925–2021), American psychologist
Shel Bachrach (born 1944), American insurance broker, investor, businessman and philanthropist
Shelley Berman (1925–2017), American comedian, born Sheldon
Sheldon Blockburger (born 1964), American decathlete
Sheldon Brookbank (born 1980), Canadian hockey player
Sheldon Brooks (1811-1883), American businessman, physician, and politician
Sheldon Brown (American football) (born 1979), American football player
Sheldon Brown (artist) (born 1962), American artist and professor of computer art
Sheldon Brown (bicycle mechanic) (1944–2008), American bicycle mechanic, writer, and webmaster
Sheldon Burnside (born 1954), American baseball player
Sheldon Canley (born 1968), American football player
Sheldon S. Cohen (1927–2018), American lawyer
Sheldon Creed (born 1997), American racing driver
Sheldon Day (born 1994), American football player
Sheldon Drobny (1945–2020), American investor
Sheldon V. Ekman (1920–1982), United States Tax Court judge
Sheldon Gaines (born 1964), American football player
Sheldon Glashow (born 1932),  American 1979 winner of the Nobel Prize in Physics
Sheldon Lejeune (1885–1962), American baseball player
Sheldon Jackson (1834–1909), American missionary
Sheldon Jackson (American football) (born 1976), American football player
Sheldon Jackson (cricketer) (born 1986), Indian cricketer
Sheldon Jones (1922–1991), American baseball player
Sheldon Kennedy (born 1969), Canadian hockey player
Sheldon Lavin (born 1932), American billionaire and owner, CEO and chairman of OSI Group
Sheldon Leonard (1907–1997), American actor
Sheldon Mallory (born 1953), American baseball player
Sheldon Neuse (born 1994), American baseball player
Sheldon Price (born 1991), American football player
Sheldon Rankins (born 1994), American football player
Sheldon Richardson (born 1990), American football player
Sheldon Silver (1944-2022), United States politician
Shel Silverstein (1930–1999), American poet, songwriter, cartoonist, and children's book author
Sheldon Souray (born 1976), Canadian hockey player
Sheldon White (born 1965), American football player and executive
Sheldon Whitehouse (born 1955), Democratic United States Senator from Rhode Island

Surname
Alexander Sheldon (1766–1832), Speaker of the New York State Assembly
 A J Sheldon (1874-1931), music critic
Benjamin R. Sheldon (1811–1897), American jurist
Bob Sheldon (born 1950), American baseball player
Brady Sheldon (born 1993), American football player
Brooke E. Sheldon (1931–2013), American librarian
Charles Sheldon (1857–1946), American Congregationalist minister
Charles H. Sheldon (1840–1898), American politician
Chris Sheldon (born 1962), record producer
David Sheldon (disambiguation), various people
Dominic Sheldon, Anglo-Irish soldier
Donald Sheldon (1921–1975), Alaskan bush pilot
Edward Sheldon (1886–1946), American dramatist
Fred Sheldon (English footballer) (1871–?), English footballer for Stoke
Fred Sheldon (Welsh footballer), Welsh footballer for Aberdare Athletic
Frederick H. Sheldon (born 1951), American ornithologist
Gene Sheldon (Eugene Hume) (1908–1982), American pantomime actor
George Sheldon (preservationist) (1818–1916), American historian, judge, and politician
George L. Sheldon (1870–1960), American politician
Gilbert Sheldon (1598–1677), Archbishop of Canterbury and builder of the Sheldonian Theatre
Grace Carew Sheldon (1855–1921), American journalist, author, editor, businesswoman
Henry D. Sheldon (1874–1948), American educator
Ingrid Sheldon (born 1945), American politician
Jack Sheldon (1931–2019), American jazz trumpeter
James M. Sheldon, (1880–1965), American football player
Jane Sheldon, Australian soprano
Jennie Maria Arms Sheldon (1852–1938), American entomologist, educator, and museum curator
Joseph Harold Sheldon (1893–1972), English physician and gerontologist
Lee Sheldon (writer), game developer and writer
Lewis Sheldon (1874–1960), American triple jumper
Lilian Sheldon (1862–1942), English zoologist
Lionel Allen Sheldon (1828–1917), American Civil War general, politician, lawyer
Louis P. Sheldon (1934–2020), American Presbyterian pastor and activist
Lurana W. Sheldon (1862–1945), American writer, editor, suffragist
Matthew Sheldon (born 1992), American soccer player
Mike Sheldon (born 1973), American football player
Oliver Sheldon (1894–1951), British businessman
Robert Sheldon, Baron Sheldon (1923–2020), British politician
Roland Sheldon (born 1936), American baseball player
Sam Sheldon (born 1989), Australian footballer
Scott Sheldon (born 1968), American baseball player
Sidney Sheldon (1917–2007), American screenwriter and novelist
Stagger Lee Sheldon (1865–1912), American murderer
Steve Sheldon, American politician
Wilfrid Percy Henry Sheldon, (1901–1983), English consulting physician
William Herbert Sheldon, (1899–1977), American psychologist
William Wallace Barbour Sheldon (1836–1915), American architect
Wilmon Henry Sheldon (1875–1981), American philosopher

Fictional characters
Paul Sheldon, fictional character from the novel Misery
Sheldon Cooper, fictional character from the television series The Big Bang Theory and the prequel series Young Sheldon 
Sheldon Lee, a fictional character in My Life as a Teenage Robot
Sheldon J. Plankton, a character in the animated television series SpongeBob SquarePants
Sheldon Mopes, protagonist of the 2002 film Death to Smoochy
Sheldon (webcomic), a daily webcomic
Sheldon, a seahorse in the Finding Nemo franchise
Sheldon Hawkes, detective/doctor in CSI: NY
Sheldon, a chick in the comic strip U.S. Acres
Sheldon, a magical genie in the television series Sigmund and the Sea Monsters
Sheldon, a fictional character from the game Splatoon
Sheldon, butler at Stourton, Charles Rainier's country house in Random Harvest by James Hilton
Shelldon, snail in the animated series of the same title
Sheldon Dinkleberg, a fictional character from The Fairly OddParents
Sheldon Wallace, a fictional character from Private Practice
Sheldon, Josh Nichols's pet turtle, who was mentioned by Josh in more than one episode, but never actually seen, in Drake & Josh.
Sheldon, a fictional squirrel from the game Animal Crossing

Animals
Sheldon, a chimpanzee featured in several books and documentaries

See also
Shel, a list of people with the given name, most actually named Sheldon

References

Given names
Surnames
Masculine given names
English-language surnames
Surnames of English origin
Surnames of British Isles origin